Aiwan-e-Iqbal is an office complex and monument in Lahore, Punjab, Pakistan under the administrative control of Ministry of Information, Broadcasting and National Heritage.

The building is named after poet and politician Allama Muhammad Iqbal, a leader of the Pakistan Movement who is widely credited with sparking the pan-Islamic thought among the Muslims of the subcontinent in the 20th century. Ceremonies in his honour are sometimes held in the building.

Aiwan-e-Iqbal is located at Edgerton Road, Lahore, and includes three rentable buildings, a large convention hall, meeting rooms, banquet hall and three portrait/painting galleries of Allama Muhammad Iqbal. It was inaugurated in October 1989.

Ministers
 Chaudhary Shafqat Mahmood- 2018–2022

Administrators
The Aiwan-e-Iqbal complex is run by an administrator, appointed by the Federal Government of Pakistan:
Here is the list of Administrators of Aiwan-e-Iqbal Complex 

 Muhammad Arshad - 1993–2002
 Muhammad Suheyl Umar - 2002–2010
 Nadeem Iqbal Abbasi - 2010–2013
 Anjum Waheed - 2013–

Accounts Officer
Shahzad Amin

Caretaker
Chaudhary Nazir Ahmad

Resident Engineer
Chaudhary Muhammad Imran

Protocol Officer
Abdul Jabbar Bhatti

References

Lahore
Buildings and structures in Lahore
Convention centres in Pakistan
Towers in Pakistan
1989 establishments in Pakistan